Anaxagoras may refer to:
Anaxagoras,a pre-Socratic Greek philosopher
Anaxagoras of Aegina, a sculptor
 4180 Anaxagoras, a main-belt asteroid
 Anaxagoras (crater), a young lunar impact crater
 Anaxagoras (mythology), a king of Argos in Greek mythology